Laurence Rase (born 4 April 1977 in Mons, Hainaut, Belgium) is a female taekwondo practitioner from Belgium. She is a two-time heavyweight medalist at the World Taekwondo Championships and won the 2006 European Championship in heavyweight.

Rase is so far the only Belgian female taekwondo practitioner to win a medal at the World Championships. Rase is so far the only Belgian taekwondo athlete to compete at the Olympics as well. She competed in the 2004 Summer Olympics but was eliminated in the quarterfinals by losing to Natália Falavigna of Brazil 8–4.

Rase has been serving as the Performance Director of the Flemish Taekwondo Union since 2010.

External links
Profile from Sports-Reference

1977 births
Living people
Belgian female taekwondo practitioners
Taekwondo practitioners at the 2004 Summer Olympics
Olympic taekwondo practitioners of Belgium
Universiade medalists in taekwondo
Universiade bronze medalists for Belgium
European Taekwondo Championships medalists
World Taekwondo Championships medalists
Medalists at the 2005 Summer Universiade
Sportspeople from Mons
21st-century Belgian women